John Mangum may refer to:
 John Mangum (defensive back) (born 1967), American football defensive back for the Chicago Bears
 John Mangum (defensive tackle) (1942–1994), his father, American football defensive tackle for the Boston Patriots
 John D. Mangum (c. 1859–1918), Michigan politician